Olmazor is a station of the Tashkent Metro on Chilonzor Line. It is located between Chilonzor and Bekat-1.

The station was opened on 6 November 1977 as the southern terminus of the inaugural section of Tashkent Metro, between October inkilobi and Sabir Rakhimov. Until 2010, the station was known as Sabir Rakhimov. On December 26, 2020 the extension of the line to Bekat-5 was opened, and Olmazar ceased to be the terminus of the line.

References

Tashkent Metro stations
Railway stations opened in 1977